The Tokyo Express was the name given by Allied forces to the use of Imperial Japanese Navy ships at night to deliver personnel, supplies, and equipment to Japanese forces operating in and around New Guinea and the Solomon Islands during the Pacific campaign of World War II. The operation involved loading personnel or supplies aboard fast warships (mainly destroyers), later submarines, and using the warships' speed to deliver the personnel or supplies to the desired location and return to the originating base all within one night so Allied aircraft could not intercept them by day.

Name
The original name of the resupply missions was "The Cactus Express", coined by Allied forces on Guadalcanal, who used the code name "Cactus" for the island.  After the U.S. press began referring to it as the "Tokyo Express," apparently in order to preserve operational security for the code word, Allied forces also began to use the phrase. The Japanese themselves called the night resupply missions , because they took place at night.

Organization and history 
Night transportation was necessary for Japanese forces due to Allied air superiority in the South Pacific, established soon after the Allied landings on Guadalcanal and the subsequent establishment of Henderson Field as a base for the "Cactus Air Force" in August 1942.  Delivery of troops and material by slow transport ships to Japanese forces on Guadalcanal and New Guinea soon proved too vulnerable to daytime air attack.  The Japanese Combined Fleet commander Admiral Isoroku Yamamoto therefore authorized the use of faster warships to make the deliveries at night when the threat of detection was much less and aerial attack minimal.

The Tokyo Express began soon after the Battle of Savo Island in August 1942 and continued until late in the Solomon Islands campaign when one of the last large Express runs was intercepted and almost completely destroyed in the Battle of Cape St. George on November 26, 1943. Because the destroyers typically used were not configured for cargo handling, many supplies were sealed inside steel drums lashed together and simply pushed into the water without the ships stopping; ideally, the drums would float ashore or were picked up by barge. However, many drums were lost or damaged; a typical night in December 1942 resulted in 1500 drums being rolled into the sea, with only 300 recovered.

Most of the warships used for Tokyo Express missions came from the Eighth Fleet, based at Rabaul and Bougainville, although ships from Combined Fleet units based at Truk were often temporarily attached for use in Express missions.  The warship formations assigned to Express missions were often formally designated as the "Reinforcement Unit", but the size and composition of this unit varied from mission to mission.

Strategic Implications
The Tokyo Express ended up being a lose-lose gambit for the Japanese, because many destroyers were lost during the fifteen months of the Tokyo Express, for no gain.  These ships could not be replaced by the stressed Japanese shipyards, and were already in short supply.  In addition, they were desperately needed for convoy duty to protect Japanese shipping supplying the Home Islands from the depredations of American submarines.

The Imperial Japanese Navy was caught in a Catch-22 situation, since American airpower from Henderson Field denied the Japanese the use of slow cargo ships. Compared to destroyers, cargo ships were much more economical in fuel usage while having the capacity to carry full loads of troops plus sufficient equipment and supplies, and having efficient cargo loading & unloading equipment. However, they were slow and comparatively unmaneuverable, and thus easily sunk - not merely sending irreplaceable supplies and freighters to the bottom but leaving their increasingly desperate troops unprovisioned and ever less able to fight.

As a result, the Navy was in essence forced to "fight as uneconomical a campaign as could possibly be imagined", since in using destroyers they had to "expend much larger quantities of fuel than they wanted" considering Imperial Japan's disadvantage in oil supply, and this "fuel was used to place very valuable (and vulnerable) fleet destroyers in an exposed forward position while delivering an insufficient quantity of men and supplies to the American meatgrinder on the island".  Even at its best (with only one-fifth of the supplies dropped ever making it to shore) the destroyer strategy amounted to waging a losing war of attrition on land and an extremely expensive rolling naval defeat.

John F. Kennedy and PT-109

John F. Kennedy's PT-109 was lost on a "poorly planned and uncoordinated" attack on a Tokyo Express run on the night of 1-2 August 1943.

The end of the Tokyo Express on Guadalcanal
By early February of 1943 the Allies had triumphed on Guadalcanal and had effective control of the area of The Slot that had been used to man and provision it, preventing a highly stressed Japanese military from being able to wage an effort to retake it and its extremely valuable Henderson Airfield.  To signify final victory over the Japanese on the island, General Alexander Patch, commander of the Allied land forces on the island, messaged his superior, Admiral William F. Halsey on February 9, 1943, "Tokyo Express no longer has terminus on Guadalcanal."

Other operations involving Japanese destroyers in transport roles
 Battle of Tassafaronga
 Operation Ke
 Battle of the Bismarck Sea
 Battle of Ormoc Bay

References

Notes

Books

 

 Online views of selections of the book:

Web

- Translation of the official record by the Japanese Demobilization Bureaux detailing the Imperial Japanese Army and Navy's participation in the Southwest Pacific area of the Pacific War.

Pacific Ocean theatre of World War II
Solomon Islands in World War II
Papua New Guinea in World War II
Autonomous Region of Bougainville